

List of most gold medals won at a single Paralympic Games
This is a list of gold medallists with four or more gold medals won in a single Paralympic Games, or the gold medallist with the highest number of gold medals won at a Paralympic Games, including Team Events.

List of most individual gold medals won at a single Paralympic Games

See also
List of multiple Olympic gold medalists
List of multiple Olympic gold medalists at a single Games
List of multiple Olympic gold medalists in one event
List of multiple Paralympic gold medalists

External links
IPC Historical Results Archive at IPC website

Multiple Paralympic gold medalists at a single Games